Baltimore County School No. 7, also known as Ashland School, is a historic school building located at Cockeysville, Baltimore County, Maryland. It was constructed in 1882 at the entrance to the village of Ashland, associated with the Ashland Iron Works. It is built of rough cut marble ashlar a nearby quarry. The exterior reflects the influence of the Queen Anne style with gabled windows, elaborate cornice work, fan-shaped attic vents at the roof peak, and numerous large banks of multi-paned windows. Originally a two-room schoolhouse, it was converted to a private residence in 1930.

It was listed on the National Register of Historic Places in 2000.

References

External links
, including photo from 1999, at Maryland Historical Trust

Houses on the National Register of Historic Places in Maryland
Houses in Baltimore County, Maryland
School buildings completed in 1882
Queen Anne architecture in Maryland
National Register of Historic Places in Baltimore County, Maryland